Events in the year 1683 in Norway.

Incumbents
Monarch: Christian V

Events
 Christiansfjell Fortress was built.

Arts and literature

Births

23 March – Anna Krefting, businesswoman (d. 1766)
5 July – Peder Colbjørnsen, timber merchant and war hero (d. 1738).
3 November – Iver Elieson, merchant (died 1753).

Deaths

See also

References